is a railway station in Moseushi, Uryū District, Hokkaidō, Japan.

Lines
Hokkaido Railway Company
Hakodate Main Line Station A23

Adjacent stations

Railway stations in Hokkaido Prefecture
Railway stations in Japan opened in 1898